Andrew Fitz Donald Jackman (born 27 January 1963) is a former Guyanese cricketer.  Jackman was a right-handed batsman who bowled right-arm off break.  He was born in Georgetown, Guyana.

Jackman made his first-class debut for Demerara against Berbice in the 1981/82 West Indian cricket season.  From the 1981/82 season to the 1989/90 season, he represented Demerara in 7 first-class matches.  He also played first-class cricket for Guyana, representing the team in 28 first-class matches between the 1981/82 season and the 1989/90 season, with his final first-class appearance for them against Barbados.  As well as Demerara and Guyana, he also played a handful of first-class matches for West Indies B, West Indies Board President's XI and West Indies Under-23s.

In his career total of 42 first-class matches, he scored 2,238 runs at a batting average of 37.93, with 9 half centuries and 5 centuries and a high score of 125.  In the field he took 25 catches and with the ball he took 3 wickets at a bowling average of 16.33, with best figures of 2/25.

It was for Guyana that he made his debut in List A cricket in 1994 against Jamaica.  From the 1983/84 season to the 1990/91 season, he represented Guyana in 14 List A matches, the last of which came against Barbados.  Jackman also played 4 List A matches West Indies B.

He later represented the Nottinghamshire Cricket Board in List A matches, making his debut for the Board against Scotland in the 1999 NatWest Trophy.  From 1999 to 2002, he represented the Board in 4 List A matches, the last of which came against Cumberland in the 1st round of the 2003 Cheltenham & Gloucester Trophy which was played in 2002.  In total, Jackman played 22 career List A matches, during which he scored 466 runs at an average of 23.30, with 4 half centuries and a high score of 73, while in the field he took 9 catches.

References

External links
Andrew Jackman at Cricinfo
Andrew Jackman at CricketArchive

1983 births
Living people
Sportspeople from Georgetown, Guyana
Demerara cricketers
Guyanese cricketers
Nottinghamshire Cricket Board cricketers
Guyana cricketers
Guyanese expatriate sportspeople in the United Kingdom